The 1962 Boston Patriots season was the franchise's third season in the American Football League. The Patriots ended with a record of nine wins and four losses and one tie, second in the AFL's Eastern Division.

This was the Patriots' third and final season at Boston University Field, with the home opener at Harvard Stadium; they moved to Fenway Park in 1963 and played there for six seasons, through 1968.

Staff

Draft picks

Schedule

Regular season

Standings

Roster 
All of the following players appeared in at least one game for the 1962 Boston Patriots.

References 

Boston Patriots
New England Patriots seasons
Boston Patriots
1960s in Boston